Wenming Xiaoshi, translated into English as Modern Times, is a novel by Li Baojia (Li Boyuan). The novel is a satire of pseudo-reformers in the Qing Dynasty period who found difficulty adjusting to modernization, including its complexities and problems. The novel consist of 60 chapters. It has often been compared to Li's other novel Officialdom Unmasked.

From 1903 to 1905 the work was serialized in Fiction Illustrated. The first edition of the entire work was published in 1906. Douglas Lancashire published an English translation, titled "Modern Times," in 1996.

Plot

In Chapter 16 Master Yao takes his son and three disciplines and Shanghai in order to show what Western civilization looks like to them. Master Yao has them explore Shanghai and familiarize themselves with the academic programs at schools in the area.

Characters

 Master Yao - He is a provincial degree holder with a son

References
 Doleželová-Velingerová, Milena. "Chapter 38: Fiction from the End of the Empire to the Beginning of the Republic (1897-1916)" in: Mair, Victor H. (editor). The Columbia History of Chinese Literature. Columbia University Press, August 13, 2013. p. 697-731. , 9780231528511.
 Hegel, Robert E. "The Chinese Novel at the Turn of the Century" (book review). Chinese Literature: Essays, Articles, Reviews (CLEAR), 07/1983, Volume 5, Issue 1/2, pp. 188 – 191
 PL, "Li Pao-chia." In: Nienhauser, William H. (editor). The Indiana Companion to Traditional Chinese Literature, Part 1. Indiana University Press, 1986. , 9780253329837.
 Yeh, Wen-hsin. "Shanghai Modernity: Commerce and Culture in a Republican City." in: Wakeman, Frederic E., Jr. and Richard Louis Edmonds (editors). Reappraising Republican China. Oxford University Press, 2000.

Notes

External links

  Wenming Xiaoshi

Novels by Li Baojia
20th-century Chinese novels
1903 novels
Novels first published in serial form